The 1980 Asia Golf Circuit was the 19th season of golf tournaments that comprised the Asia Golf Circuit. 

Golfers from Taiwan again dominated the circuit with six tournament wins from the ten events. Lu Hsi-chuen repeated his performance from 1979 as he won three times and collected the overall circuit prize. American players continued to make inroads, as Kurt Cox finished second in the standings having won in India and Singapore.

Tournament schedule
The table below shows the 1980 Asian Golf Circuit schedule. With the return of the Philippine Open, which had been withdrawn from the circuit in 1979, the tour was back up to ten tournaments in 1980.

Final standings

References

Asia Golf Circuit
Asia Golf Circuit